The CooCoo Nut Grove is a 1936 Warner Bros. Merrie Melodies short animated film, set in the famed Cocoanut Grove of the Ambassador Hotel in Los Angeles. The cartoon was directed by Friz Freleng, with animation by Robert McKimson and Sandy Walker, caricature design by T. Hee, and musical score by Carl Stalling. The short was released on November 28, 1936.

Plot
"Thru' the Courtesy of Love" (Scholl/Jerome) plays during the opening scene. Then, Master of Ceremonies Ben Birdie (bandleader Ben Bernie, voiced by Tedd Pierce) is accosted by Walter Windpipe (Walter Winchell, voiced by Danny Webb). The short then proceeds to showcase many Hollywood stars in the form of Ralph Barton-esque caricatures, including Katharine Hepburn (as a horse named Miss Heartburn), Jean Harlow, Bette Davis, Ned Sparks (voiced by Dave Barry), W. C. Fields (voiced by Tedd Pierce), Clark Gable, Groucho and Harpo Marx, Johnny Weissmuller (in character as Tarzan) and Lupe Vélez, Mae West (voiced by Verna Deane), Wallace Beery, John Barrymore, Laurel and Hardy, Edward G. Robinson, Fred Astaire, and George Raft. Musical entertainments are provided by Edna May Oliver as "The Lady in Red", the Dionne quintuplets (who were in reality two years old at the time, all voiced by Bernice Hansen), and Helen Morgan (voiced by Verna Deane), sitting on the piano, turning on the tears with a torch song that causes most of the guests to cry (except Ben Birdie and a few others), flooding the Grove in the process. Whereas other cartoons have caricatured celebrities as either humans or animals, this short does both—half are seen as human, half as animals.

Production notes
The title is sometimes mis-labeled as The Coo-Coo Nut Groove. This cartoon was followed by The Woods Are Full Of Cuckoos (1937) and Have You Got Any Castles? (1938), both parodying Hollywood personalities.

Home media
Looney Tunes Golden Collection: Volume 3.

References

External links
 

1936 animated films
1936 films
Merrie Melodies short films
Warner Bros. Cartoons animated short films
Animation based on real people
Short films directed by Friz Freleng
1936 comedy films
Cultural depictions of Clark Gable
Cultural depictions of Fred Astaire
Cultural depictions of Edward G. Robinson
Cultural depictions of Johnny Weissmuller
Cultural depictions of Mae West
Cultural depictions of the Marx Brothers
Cultural depictions of Laurel & Hardy
Cultural depictions of W. C. Fields
Films scored by Carl Stalling
1930s Warner Bros. animated short films